Lindsay George Beck (4 April 1900 – 5 February 1982) was an Australian rules footballer who played with Port Adelaide and Glenelg in the South Australian National Football League (SANFL) and  in the Victorian Football League (VFL).

Football
After commencing his career with South Broken Hill Football Club, Beck moved to Adelaide and played with Port Adelaide in 1921–1922, returned to Broken Hill for the 1923 season and then played for Glenelg in 1924. He again returned to South Broken Hill for the 1925 season.

Beck and his South Broken Hill team-mate Tom Everuss both joined  at the start of the 1926 VFL season. He made his debut against North Melbourne in Round 2 and played the next game and was then dropped. Beck then returned to South Broken Hill.

Honours and achievements 
Team
 SANFL premiership player: 1921

Notes

External links 

1900 births
1982 deaths
Australian rules footballers from New South Wales
Port Adelaide Football Club (SANFL) players
Port Adelaide Football Club players (all competitions)
Glenelg Football Club players
Hawthorn Football Club players
South Broken Hill Football Club players